A Twenty20 International (T20I) is an international cricket match between two teams that have official T20I status, as determined by the International Cricket Council. It is played under the rules of Twenty20 cricket and is the shortest format of the game. The first such match was played on 17 February 2005 between Australia and New Zealand. The Nepal national cricket team played their first T20I match on 16 March 2014, against Hong Kong as part of the 2014 ICC World Twenty20, winning the match by 80 runs.

This list comprises all members of the Nepal national cricket team who have played at least one T20I match. It is initially arranged in the order in which each player won his first Twenty20 International cap. Where more than one player won his first Twenty20 International cap in the same match, those players are listed alphabetically by last name.

Key

Players 

Statistics are correct as of 30 August 2022.

Captains

Notes

See also 
List of Nepal Twenty20 International records
List of Nepal ODI cricketers
List of Nepalese First-class cricketers
List of Nepalese List A cricketers
List of Nepalese Twenty20 cricketers

References

 
T20I cricketers
Nepal